Timote, also known as Cuica or Timote–Cuica, is the language of the Timote–Cuica state in the Venezuelan Andes, around the present city of Mérida and south of Lake Maracaibo.

The language is reported to have gone extinct in the early to mid 20th century. However, in 1977 it was reported that the indigenous village of Mutús, in the heart of the old Timote state, still spoke an indigenous language, which would presumably be Timote. The name is apparently Timote, as 'Timote' itself derives from ti-motɨ 'Mutú speakers', and mutú or mukú is a common toponym in the region. This lead had not been followed up as of Adelaar (2004).

Dialects
The Timote and Cuica peoples apparently spoke dialects of a single language; some of the last reports of Cuica claim it was nothing other than Timote. Data is limited, but the connection is clear in the numerals:

Consonant clusters, somewhat unusual for the area, are found, especially in Cuica: kču 'bird', stots 'blood', Timote klef 'rainy season', hutn 'dog'.

Mason (1950)
Mason (1950) provides a lengthy internal classification of Cuica and Timote:

Timóte (Timoti)
1. Timóte proper
Mukurujún
Mukusé
Mokoyupu
Mukuarsé
Ciribuy
Miyoy
Mukumbá
Kindorá
Tafallé
Mukumbají
Chino
2. Mocochí (Mokochi)
Miyuse
Tukaní
Mokochi (Torondoy)
3. Mukutu (Escaguey)
Eskaguey
Kanaguá
Kinó
Mokoino (Mokino)
Mombun
Yarikagua
Arikagua
Mukutuy
Mukupatí
Mukuchachi
Trikagua
Mokoto (Mukutu, Mukutí)
Guarake
Bailadores
4. Tapano
Aviamo
Mokombó (Mokobo)
Tapano

5. Chama (Miguri ?)
Mokunche (Mukunche, Mukuneche)
Mukurubá (Mokuruguá)
Tabay (Mukunutáne, Tabayon ?)
Mukurumagua
Guake (Guakí)
Mukumba
Chichuy
Mukuñoke (Mukuño, Migurí ?)
Mukurufuén
Muká
Mukumpí
Mukutirí
Mukusnandá
Mukaikuy
Mukusó, etc.
Mukurandá
Mukuhúun (Mukupine, Mokoion)
Chiguará
Insnumbí (Insumbi)
Estankes
Mukuchi (Makuchi, Mokochiz)
Misantá
Mokao
Mosnachó
Misikea, etc.
Eskagüey
Mukujún
Tatuy (Tatey ?)
Mukaria
Mukaketá
Mukusirí
Kaparú
Jají (Mukundú)
Mukubache (Mirripú, Mirripuy, Maripú ?)
Mukúun (Mukumpú, Lagunillas)
Kasés
Mukuinamo
Arikagua
Tibikuay
Makulare
Mukusumpú
Barbudos
Jamuén, etc.
Kinaró
Tiguiñó
Guaruní (Guarurí)

Cuica (Kuika)
1. Cuica proper
2. Tostó
Tostó proper
Tiranjá
Tomoní
3. Eskuke (Eskukey)
Eskuke proper
Bombá
Moka
Tirandá
Chobú
Chachike
Chachu
Tirandá proper
Estiguate (Estiguati)
4. Jajó (Jakón, Jajón)
Jajó proper
Esnijaque
Kikoke (Kikoki)
Mapen (La Vega)
Duri
Mikimboy

Unclassified tribes
Kirorá
Mijure
Montun
Iguino

References

Adelaar, Willem & Pieter Muysken (2004). The Languages of the Andes. Cambridge University Press. pp. 124–129

External links
 Fabre: Mutús

Indigenous languages of the Americas
Timotean languages
Languages of Venezuela